Kaiyethum Doorath is an Indian Malayalam language television series airing on Zee Keralam and streams on Zee5.
The series is an official remake of Zee Telugu series Raktha Sambandham. It stars krishnapriya and sajesh Nambiar in the lead roles.

Synopsis
The story is about the loving relationship of two siblings, Krishna Prasad and Krishna Priya, sharing a strong bond with them, Priya adores Krishna Prasad and is even willing to sacrifice her own happiness for her brother's needs.

Prasad's wife, Durga and Priya become pregnant around the same time.During baby shower ceremony Mangalam (Prasad and Priya's paternal aunt) insults Durga, so she vows that she will die if she doesn't give birth to a male child. Sulochana a.k.a. Sulu (Durga's distinct relative) sows seeds of bitterness in Durga's heart which widens the gap between Durga and Priya. Unfortunately, Durga gets a girl, Tulasi. Priya gives birth to a boy, Adhitya. Later they are exchanged by their parents to save Durga's life. Only Priya and her husband know the truth of the children's birth.

After child birth with the proudness of having given an heir to the family, Durga starts to drift away from the rest of the family members. Sulu incites Durga that Priya is trying to take away her son which becomes the main reason for Durga's hatred towards Priya. Soon Mangalam join hands with Durga only to destroy the family using Durga as a tool. The sisterly bond between Durga and Priya fades away and hatred and jealousy comes in as the children grow up. Durga gets fed up with the growing bond between Aadhi and Tulasi and demands partition of the property or she would leave the house with Aadhi.

Durga and Priya both buy houses in the same area. Durga also ends the relation between Aadhi and Thulasi. Aadhi grows up to have a strong hatred towards Thulasi. He often insults Thulasi.

Durga always boasts about her son and insults Priya and Tulasi. Tulasi always enjoys fighting with Durga which annoys Durga. Mangalam decides to harm Thulasi so that they could be safe from her. Thulasi meets with an accident but is saved by Aadhi. To pay the operation fees Priya seeks help from Durga who in turns asks for the house Priya lives in. Durga is seen to have a soft corner for Priya even though she hates Thulasi.Then Tulasi and Adhitya fall in love with each other but Durga on knowing the fact makes Aadhi promise her that she will not make Thulasi her daughter-in law. the rest of the story is about how Durga tries to separate the loving couple and how Tulasi overcomes the hard conditions and wins Durga's acceptance for their wedding.

Cast

Main
 Krishnapriya K Nair as Thulasi/ Krishnathulasi Aadithyan
A naughty, brave girl; Adi's cousin and his love interest who turns to be his wife
 Jaysheelan and Priya's adoptive daughter, Prasad and Durga's Biological daughter
 Sajesh Nambiar as Adi a.k.a. Aadithyan
 a dull and calm boy; Thulasi's cousin and love interest who turns to be her husband
 Prasad and Durga's adoptive son, Jayasheelan and Priya's biological son
 Vishnu Prasad as Rajeev(main villain)
 Husband of LEKHA IPS

Recurring
 Vaishnavi Saikumar as Kanaka Durga a.k.a. Durga Prasad
The Antagonist, foster mother of Adi and biological mother of Thulasi
 Lavanya Nair as Krishna Priya Jayasheelan
Foster mother of Thulasi and biological mother of Adi
 Sharran Puthumana as ACP Krishna Prasad
Durga's husband and Priya's elder brother, the foster father of Adi and biological father of Thulasi
Anand Thrissur as Jayasheelan / Jayan
Priya's husband, he is the Foster father of Thulasi and Biological father of Aadhi
 Kanya Bharathi as Mangala
Durga's aunt and Athira's grandmother
Maneesha Jayasingh / Ardra Das as Athira
Mangalam's Grand Daughter, Praseetha's Daughter whom Durga sees as her Daughter-In-Law
Gowri Krishnan as Gayathri Devi
PWD Minister of Kerala
Anandhu as Sreehari / Hari
Gayathri Devi's Younger Brother and he wishes to marry Thulasi
Manju Vineesh as Sulu
Durga's faithful house servant
Geetha Nair as Rugminiyamma
Priya and Prasad's mother and Grandmother of Thulasi and Adi, mother in law of Durga and Jayan
J. Padmanabhan Thampi as Shanthan 
Mangalam's husband 
Indulekha as Dr.Indu
Kiran Raj as Chandra Das
Sreedevi Unni as Mandakini a.k.a Veluthamma
P. Remadevi

Guest roles
Lakshmi Gopalaswamy
Priyanka Anoop
Lekshmi Prasad
Richard Jose
Swathy Nithyanand

Adaptations

Awards and Nominations

References

External links
 Kaiyethum Doorath at ZEE5

Zee Keralam original programming
Malayalam-language television shows
2020 Indian television series debuts